The 2019 Lucas Oil Late Model Dirt Series was the 14th season of the Lucas Oil Late Model Dirt Series, a national touring series for dirt late models owned & operated by Lucas Oil. The series began with the Super Bowl of Racing at Golden Isles Speedway on February 1, and ended with the Dirt Track World Championship at Portsmouth Raceway Park on October 19. Jonathan Davenport won the 2019 drivers' championship. Tyler Erb was named 2019 rookie of the year.

Schedule and results

The 2019 schedule was released on October 29, 2018.

Schedule notes and changes
 The Super Bowl of Racing scheduled for February 1 at the Golden Isles Raceway in Brunswick, Georgia was postponed due to rain.
 On March 15, the Buckeye Spring 50 at Atomic Speedway in Chillicothe, Ohio was postponed mid-program due to rain. The race was rescheduled for April 11.
 The Steel Valley 50 scheduled for April 12 at Sharon Speedway was rained out.
 The Rumble by the River scheduled for April 14 at Port Royal Speedway was canceled due to a wet forecast.
 On April 25, rain forced the Hoker Trucking 50 at Tri-City Speedway in Granite City, Illinois to be rescheduled to July 11 and the scheduled race at Macon Speedway to be rescheduled to July 23.
 On May 2, the LOLMDS announced that the scheduled race at Tazewell Speedway was rescheduled to June 28, and the Ralph Latham Memorial at the Florence Speedway was rescheduled to June 29 in response to a wet forecast.
 The North Star Nationals scheduled for May 18 at Deer Creek Speedway in Spring Valley, Minnesota was rained out.
 On May 21, the LOLMDS announced that the Show-Me 100 at Lucas Oil Speedway in Wheatland, Missouri was being postponed due to tornado damage to the facility. The race was canceled on May 28.
 On July 3, the LOLMDS race at Muskingum County Speedway was rained out.
 The Freedom 50 at Mansfield Motor Speedway scheduled for July 6 was rained out.
 The LOLMDS race at the Jackson Motorplex in Minnesota scheduled for July 17 was rained out.

References

Lucas Oil Late Model Dirt Series